Podłęże may refer to the following places:
Podłęże, Chrzanów County in Lesser Poland Voivodeship (south Poland)
Podłęże, Wieliczka County in Lesser Poland Voivodeship (south Poland)
Podłęże, Łódź Voivodeship (central Poland)
Podłęże, Świętokrzyskie Voivodeship (south-central Poland)